Emiliano Lauzi (born 22 September 1994) is an Italian snowboarder who competed in the men's slopestyle and big air events at the 2022 Winter Olympics. Lauzi had finished sixth in the big air event at the Aspen 2021 World Championships.

References

External links

1994 births
Living people
Italian male snowboarders
Olympic snowboarders of Italy
Snowboarders at the 2022 Winter Olympics
Sportspeople from Milan
21st-century Italian people